Beat Your Neighbour was a British comic strip which appeared in Knockout in September 1971 and also in Whizzer and Chips.

The strip  centred on two families which lived next door to each other. Although the introductory title picture shows them arguing, the two families often tried to be pleasant to one another while secretly trying to outdo each other. The results were quite often far-fetched but unexpected.

One example was when one family said to the other that they should drink more milk for health reasons: the second family ordered more milk, the first family ordered even more, and eventually they were both ordering milk in churns, until the dairy brought the cows to their houses and told them to milk the cows themselves.

References

Comic strips missing date information
Fleetway and IPC Comics
British comic strips